Kukak may refer to:

Mount Kukak
Kahak, Iran
Kuhak, Iran
Kukak Bay Cannery, located on the Alaska Peninsula
Kukak Village Site, also located on the Alaska Peninsula